James C. Rockwell (October 4, 1881- July 30, 1962) was an American businessman. He was President of the Manila Electric Railroad and Light Company (Meralco), Director of the American Chamber of Commerce in Manila, Charter member and President of the Rotary Club of Manila, and Founder and Commodore of the Manila Yacht Club. Rockwell Center is named after him.

Early life 
Rockwell was born in Scranton, Pennsylvania to William B. Rockwell and his wife, Clara L. Chapman.

Education 
In 1904, Rockwell graduated from Cornell University in Ithaca, New York with a Bachelor of Science in Engineering.

Career 
In 1911, Rockwell arrived in Manila to join the Manila Electric Railroad and Light Company (Meralco) as a railway manager. In 1919, he was appointed Vice-President and later became general manager. In 1939 he became President.  

In 1939, Rockwell was the Director of the American Chamber of Commerce in Manila.

Santo Tomas Internment Camp 
In World War II, during the Japanese occupation of the Philippines, Rockwell, his wife Ann and their son James C. Rockwell Jr. were interned at the Santo Tomas Internment Camp in Manila.

Personal life 
On May 8, 1913, Rockwell married Dorothy Shepard at the American Consulate General in Yokohama, Empire of Japan. 

On July 1, 1919, Rockwell became the 2nd President of the Rotary Club of Manila, after its charter was handed down, succeeding Leon J. Lambert who served as President for a month during incorporation. Rockwell completed his term on June 30, 1920, at the end of the first full Rotary year. 

On August 28, 1926, Rockwell married Ann Hanlon in Manila. On July 29, 1928, Rockwell and Hanlon's son James Chapman Rockwell Jr. was born.

In 1927, Rockwell founded the Manila Yacht Club and served as its Commodore. Rockwell also played a role in the establishment of the Manila Polo Club and Manila Golf Club.

Death and legacy 
Rockwell died on July 30, 1962 and was buried in El Carmelo Cemetery in Pacific Grove, California.

Rockwell Thermal Plant and Rockwell Center 
In 1950, Meralco began operating the Rockwell Thermal Plant named after Rockwell in Makati. In 1994, the thermal plant became decommissioned.  The plant building became the upscale Power Plant Mall.

In 1995, López Holdings Corporation formed the Rockwell Land Corporation to develop the  area of the former thermal plant. The development retained Rockwell's name and is now known as Rockwell Center.

References 

1881 births
1962 deaths
Businesspeople from Pennsylvania
Cornell University College of Engineering alumni
People from Scranton, Pennsylvania